A manvantara, in Hindu cosmology, is a cyclic period of time identifying the duration, reign, or age of a Manu, the progenitor of mankind. In each manvantara, seven Rishis, certain deities, an Indra, a Manu, and kings (sons of Manu) are created and perish. Each manvantara is distinguished by the Manu who rules/reigns over it, of which we are currently in the seventh manvantara of fourteen, which is ruled by Vaivasvata Manu.

Etymology
Manvantara, sometimes spelled manwantara or manuantara, is a compound of manu and antara, creating manu-antara or manvantara, literally meaning "the duration of a Manu", or his lifespan, with synonym meanings of "the interval, reign, period, or age of a Manu".

Sandhya or sandhi, sometimes with a compound of kala, have been used to represent "the juncture before or after a manvantara", a period of universal deluge (flood):
 manvantara sandhya
 manvantara sandhi
 sandhya kala when describing a manvantara
 sandhi kala when describing a manvantara

Duration and structure

Each manvantara lasts for 306,720,000 years (852,000 divine years; 1 divine year = 360 solar years) and repeats seventy-one Yuga Cycles (world ages). In a kalpa (day of Brahma), which lasts for 4.32 billion years (12 million divine years or 1,000 Yuga Cycles), there are a total of fourteen manvantaras (14 x 71 = 994 Yuga Cycles), where each is followed by and the first preceded by a manvantara-sandhya (fifteen sandhyas) with each sandhya lasting for 1,728,000 years (4,800 divine years; the duration of Satya Yuga). During each manvantara-sandhya, the earth (Bhu-loka) is submerged in water.

Each kalpa has 14 manvantaras and 15 manvantara-sandhyas in the following order:
 1st manvantara-sandhya ( adi sandhya)
 1st manvantara
 2nd manvantara-sandhya
 2nd manvantara
 ...
 14th manvantara-sandhya
 14th manvantara
 15th manvantara-sandhya

Manusmriti, Ch. 1:

Surya Siddhanta, Ch. 1:

Vishnu Purana, Part 1, Ch. 3:

Manus

In our current kalpa (day of Brahma), these fourteen Manu's reign in succession:

See also
 Itihasa
 Hindu units of time
 Kalpa (day of Brahma)
 Manvantara (age of Manu)
 Pralaya (period of dissolution)
 Yuga Cycle (four yuga ages): Satya (Krita), Treta, Dvapara, and Kali
 Hindu cosmology
 List of numbers in Hindu scriptures
 Manu
 Saptarishi (Names in each manvantara)

References

Hindu philosophical concepts
Hindu astronomy